For aircraft specification calculation in aeronautics, limit load (LL) is the maximum load factor authorized during flight, Mathematically, limit load is LL =  LLF x W, where LL = limit load, LLF = limit load factor, and W = weight of the aircraft.

Limit load is constant for all weights above design gross weight. The limit load factor is reduced if gross weight is increased. But the LLF cannot be increased if the gross weight is decreased below the design gross weight. Engine mounts and other structural members are designed for the nominal LLF. The nominal or limit load Bn is the load which should only occur once (or only a very few times) during the lifetime of an aircraft. Bn may therefore only occur once during (e.g.) 60,000 hours of flying. No plastic deformation is allowed at this level of a load.

The limit load can be found relatively easily by statistically analysing the data collected during the many hours of logged flights (which is continuously being gathered).

See also
Ultimate load

References 

Aeronautics